Fuerte San Francisco are a professional football club based in San Francisco Gotera, El Salvador.

History
In 1991, Fuerte San Francisco obtained promotion to the Primera División de Fútbol Profesional for the first and so far only time and managed to stay there for three years. 
The club was relegated from the Primera División de Fútbol de El Salvador after 1992/1993 season. In 2009 they were relegated to the Third Division.
However, after winning both the Apertura 2014 and Clausura 2015 title Fuerte San Francisco were promoted to the Segunda Division for 2015–2016 seasons.

Rivalries
The team's main historic and geographic rival is C.D. Vista Hermosa. The rivalry stems from the two teams being based in Morazán and regular competing to be promoted to the primera division. However the clubs have not played each other since Vista became defunct for a few years before being reborn in the ADFA Morazán (Fourth tier) of El Salvador.

Kit history

Jersey Suppliers

Stadium
The team's home venue is the Estadio Correcaminos with a capacity of 12,000. Which used to be the home of Vista Hermosa, However, after the team become defunct Fuerte San Francisco took over as the sole tenant.
They previously played at the Estadio Luis Amílcar Moreno in San Francisco Gotera. They share the stadium with Vista Hermosa.
 Estadio Luis Amílcar Moreno (1998−2012)
 Estadio Correcaminos (2013–)

Honours

Domestic honours
 Segunda División Salvadorean and predecessors 
 Champions (2) : 1991, 2022 Apertura
 Tercera División Salvadorean and predecessors 
 Champions:(7) : 1974,  1978, Apertura 2001, Apertura 2013, Apertura 2014, Apertura 2015, Clausura 2015
Liga Media: (1)
 Champions (1): Clausura 1949

Club records
 First victory in the Primera Division for Fuerte San Francisco: 2-1 TBD, August 17, 2019
 First goalscorer for  Fuerte San Francisco: TBA v TBD, August 10, 2019
 First goalscorer in the Primera Division for  Fuerte San Francisco: TBA v TBD, August 10, 2019
 Largest Home victory, Primera División: 3-0 v TBD, 9 March 2020
 Largest Away victory, Primera División: 4-0 TBD, November 18, 2019
 Largest Home loss, Primera División:  4-0 v TBD, 25 August 2019
 Largest Away loss, Primera División:  0-6 TBD, 18 October 2020.
 Highest home attendance: 2,000 v Primera División, 2018
 Highest away attendance: 1,000 v Primera División, San Salvador, 2018
 Highest average attendance, season: 00,000, Primera División
 Most goals scored, TBD season, Primera División: 21, TBD, 2018
 Worst season: Primera Division Apertura 2019: 3 win, 5 draws and 14 losses (14 points)
 First CONCACAF Champions League match: N/A

Individual records
 Record appearances (all competitions):  TBD, 89 from 2019 to Present
 Record appearances (Primera Division):  Salvadoran TBD, 89 from 2019 to Present
 Most capped player for El Salvador: 63 (0 whilst at Fuerte San Francisco), TBD
 Most international caps for El Salvador while a Fuerte San Francisco player: 2, TBD.
 Most caps won whilst at  Fuerte San Francisco: 2, TBD.
 Record scorer in league:  TBD, 16
 Most goals in a season (all competitions): TBD, 62 (1927/28) (47 in League, 15 in Cup competitions)
 Most goals in a season (Primera Division): TBD, 12
 First goal scorer in International competition: N/A

Top goalscorers 

Note: Players in bold text are still active with Fuerte San Francisco

Non-playing staff

Coaching staff

Management

Kit evolution

Primera División de Fútbol de El Salvador club coefficient ranking
(As of 30 May 2013), Source: Primera División de Fútbol de El Salvador

El Salvador 1991/92

Goalie: Agustin Aguilar
Died, December 2. 2007

Current squad
As for October, 2021

Notable players
Note: this list includes players that have appeared in at least 100 league games and/or have reached international status.

  Pablo Martinez “La Perla Negra” 
 Victor Coreas
 Luis Amilcar Moreno
 Sergio Ivan Munoz
 Rolando Torres
  Elder Figueroa
 Marlon Medrano
 Osmel Zapata
 Erick Ortega
 Ruben Alonso
 Raul Esnal
 Gustavo Faral

Captains

List of Coaches

  Pablo Martinez “La Perla Negra”
  Mario Rene Chacon (1984-1985)
  Henry Arias (1989–1990)
  Armando Hernandez (1991)
  Saúl Molina (1991–1992)
   Ricardo Guardado (1993)
  Esteban Melara
   Marcelo Javier Zuleta
  Omar Sevilla (2004)
   Eraldo Correia (2005)
  José Ramón Avilés
   Efraín Núñez (2006)
  Mauricio Alvarenga (2007)
   Rubén Alonso (2008)
  Manuel Ramos (2009–2010)
  Jorge Garay (2013)
  Marvin Hernandez (2014–September 2015)
  Yahir Camero (September 2015 –December 2015)
  Sergio Munoz (January 2016 – July 2016)
  Yahir Camero (August 2016 – September 2016)
  Luis Dagoberto Sosa (September 2016 – October 2016)
  Omar Sevilla (October 2016 – December 2016)
  Luis Carlos Asprilla	(December 2016)
  Marvin Javier Hernández (2017 - June 2019)
  Nelson Alvarenga (July 2019 - October 2019)
  Luis Dagoberto Sosa (October 2019 - March 2020)
 Hiatus (April 2020 - July 2020)
  Omar Sevilla (August 2020 - June 2021)
  Marvin Garcia (June 2021 - September 2021)
  Luis Ramírez Zapata (September 2021 - December 2021)
  Pablo Quinonez (December 2021 - Present)

Corporate management

References

External links
 El adiós de los comandos – La Prensa Gráfica 

Football clubs in El Salvador